William Arthur Brewer (19 May 1893 – 13 November 1914) was an English professional footballer who played as a centre forward in the Southern League for Swindon Town.

Personal life
Prior to the First World War, Brewer worked as a woollen cloth weaver and served in the Territorial Force for three years. On 1 September 1914, a week after the outbreak of the First World War, he re-enlisted in the Wiltshire Regiment in Devizes as a private. While serving with D Company of the 1st Battalion, Brewer was killed in action at Hooge on 13 November 1914. His body was never recovered and he is commemorated on the Menin Gate.

Career statistics

See also 
List of people who disappeared

References

External links 

 

1893 births
1914 deaths
Association football forwards
British Army personnel of World War I
British military personnel killed in World War I
Chippenham Town F.C. players
English footballers
Footballers from Wiltshire
Missing in action of World War I
Missing person cases in Belgium
People from Chippenham
Southern Football League players
Swindon Town F.C. players
Military personnel from Wiltshire
Wiltshire Regiment soldiers